Anticlides of Athens (or Anticleides) lived after the time of Alexander the Great, and is frequently referred to by later writers. At least four works may be attributed to him; whether these works were all written by Anticlides of Athens cannot be decided with certainty. None survive, except in scanty quotations:

1. Peri Noston was an account of the return of the Greeks from their ancient expeditions. Anticlides' statement about the Pelasgians, which Strabo quotes, is probably taken from the work on the Nostoi.

2. Deliaca, about Delos

3. Exegeticus appears to have been a sort of Dictionary, in which perhaps an explanation of those words and phrases was given which occurred in the ancient stories.

4. On Alexander, of which the second book is quoted by Diogenes Laërtius.

References

Hellenistic-era historians
Ancient Athenian historians
3rd-century BC Greek people
3rd-century BC historians